Ek Bura Aadmi is an unreleased Hindi Political, Thriller film directed by Ishraq Shah and produced by Surendra Rajiv and Zenaida Mastura. This is a work of fiction inspired by real-life stories of well-known criminals turned politicians from the North Indian states of UP and Bihar. The film is a realistic portrayal of power politics where money and muscle play very prominent roles. The film was to be released on 26 July 2013.
The film features Arunoday Singh, Kitu Gidwani, Raghuveer Yadav and Yashpal Sharma as main characters.

Cast

Arunoday Singh as Munna Siddiqui
Kitu Gidwani as Rukmi Devi 
Raghubir Yadav as Prabhunath Pandey
Yashpal Sharma as Rajnath Chowdhary
Deepak Singh as Sajid Siddiqi 
Angira Dhar
Vishal O Sharma
Vinod Nahardih

Plot
The film revolves around the power politics of the Hindi heartland of UP and Bihar.

Soundtrack

The music as well as the background score has been composed by Tochi Raina and his Band of Bandagi. Lyrics have been penned by Nasir Faraaz, Arafat Mehmood & Ishraq. The film features six songs:

Suraj Sehra Mein Akela Hai (Romantic Fusion) – Nasir faraaz
Yeh Tamasha Kya Hai (Sufi / Jazz / Rock Fusion) – Sufi
Uchal Gayi Chamiya (Item Number / Nautanki) – Mehmood Arafat
Gaon Ki Radha Ka Rukh (Folk - Holi) – Ishraq
Uth Ja Tham Le Tiranga (Patriotic / Call to Action) – Ishraq
The audio was released by Times Music (Junglee) in Delhi on 14 June and has been made available on all the digital platforms
.

References

External links
Ek Bura Aadmi 2013 at Official Facebook Page

Indian political thriller films
Unreleased Hindi-language films
Indian crime thriller films
Crime in Bihar
Films shot in Lucknow